Pati is the capital and the namesake of the Pati Regency in Central Java, Indonesia. According to the 2010 census, its population was 102,873. The latest official estimate (for mid 2016) was 107,028.

Climate
Pati has a tropical monsoon climate (Am) with moderate to little rainfall from May to October and heavy to very heavy rainfall from November to April.

References 

Pati Regency
Populated places in Central Java